Lieutenant Colonel Muhammad Abu Ali  (15 August 1980 – 4 November 2016) was a Nigerian Army officer who commanded the Army's 272 Tank Battalion. He was a prince to the people of Bassa Nge in Kogi state. He was killed in an ambush by Boko Haram in Malam Fatori, Borno State.

Early life and education
Ali graduated from Command Secondary School, Jos Plateau State Nigeria, in 1997 and was admitted to the Nigerian Defence Academy in 1998 as a member of the 50th Regular Course. He was commissioned as a 2nd Lieutenant into the Nigerian Army Armour Corps in September 2003. His father was Brigadier General Abu Ali, now the Etsu of Bassa-Nge Kingdom in Kogi State.

Career
He participated in the United Nations Mission in Liberia (UNMIL), United Missions in Darfur (UNMO), and received an accelerated promotion from the rank of Major to Lieutenant Colonel, receiving a gallantry award by the Chief of Army Staff, Lieutenant General Tukur Yusuf Buratai in September 2015.

Chief of Army Staff award for exceptional bravery
Ali received the Chief of Army Staff award in Gamboru for exceptional bravery from Lt Gen Tukur Yusuf Buratai on 9 September 2015, for his role in the fight against Boko Haram.

Death
Ali along with six other soldiers were ambushed and killed by Boko Haram on 4th November, 2016. He was buried on 7 November 2016, at the National Military Cemetery, Abuja.

References

Nigerian Army officers
Nigerian Defence Academy alumni
1980 births
2016 deaths
Nigerian military personnel killed in action
War-related deaths in Nigeria